Wallace "Wally" Perry Wolf Jr. (October 2, 1930 – March 12, 1997) was an American competition swimmer, water polo player, and Olympic champion.  He competed in the 1948, 1952, 1956, and 1960 Summer Olympics.

Personal

Wolf was born in Los Angeles, California, and was Jewish.  He was the son of famous vaudeville music director Rube Wolf Sr. and Fanchonnette Sunny (Rutherford) Wolf.  He married Carolyn Wyatt and had three children - Wallace Scott, John, and Lori, and the family lived in Manhattan Beach, California. He died in Santa Ynez, California.

Career

At Beverly Hills High School (class of 1947), Wolf won the California Interscholastic Federation (CIF) 220y-freestyle championship three years in a row, 1945-47 (with times of 2:32.2, 2:23.7, and 2:19.1), the individual medley - 75 yards two years in a row, 1946-47 (with times of 45.7 and 44.4), and was the CIF record holder in 220y-freestyle and individual medley.

As a 17-year-old representing the United States at the 1948 Olympics in London, Wolf won a gold medal as member of the U.S. team in the men's 4×200-meter freestyle relay which set a world record of 8:46. At the US Olympic trials of the 1948 4x200-meter freestyle relay, several swimmers who had already qualified in other events slowed down in their heats or swam fast in the prelims and scratched themselves for the final to allow more swimmers to qualify for the US Olympic Team. He was the top qualifier in the 4×200-meter freestyle relay trials final with a time of 2:14 flat.

Ultimately, coach Robert Kiphuth did hold a time trial shortly after the actual trials with 11 of the swimmers.  This time trial had Jimmy McLane as first overall with a time of 2:11.0, Bill Smith and Wally Wolf in 2:11.2, and Wally Ris in 2:12.4.  This quartet was used for the Olympic final and won the gold medal.  The next four-Eugene Rogers in 2:14.2, Edwin Gilbert in 2:15.4, Robert Gibe in 2:15.6, and William Dudley in 2:15.9, were used in the Olympic prelims. The next three swimmers-Joe Verdeur who came in 2:16.3, Alan Ford in 2:16.4 and George Hoogerhyde in 2:17.4 were not used in any capacity in the 4x200 freestyle relay.

Four years later at the 1952 Olympics in Helsinki, Finland, Wolf once again was the top qualifier in the 4x200-meter freestyle relay at the US Olympic trials.  Like the trials in 1948, several top swimmers-Ford Konno, Clarke Scholes, William Woolsey, Wayne Moore and Jimmy McLane swam under their potential in the trials and failed to qualify for the final who had otherwise qualified in other events.  Coach Matt Mann used four of the swimmers who actually qualified in the trials for the Olympic prelim. He swam a second heat leg setting a new Olympic record of 2:11.4.  For the final, Mann used Konno, Woolsey, Moore, and McLane who won the gold medal.  Wolf helped the U.S. relay team to qualify for the final of the men's 4×200-meter freestyle relay, but, under the international swimming rule of the time, he was not awarded with a medal because he did not swim in the event final.

Wolf attended the University of Southern California (USC), where he swam for the USC Trojans swimming and diving team in National Collegiate Athletic Association (NCAA) competition and was a four-time All American.  He graduated from USC with a bachelor's degree in 1951, and later returned to USC Law School to earn a law degree in 1957.

Wolf was a member of the U.S. men's team that finished fifth in the 1956 water polo tournament in Melbourne, Australia, playing in five matches.  Again, four years later at the 1960 Olympics in Rome, he finished seventh with the U.S. men's water polo team in the 1960 tournament.  He played all seven matches and scored five goals. He was named to the 1964 Olympics US water polo team, but did not accept the appointment.

Honors
In 1976, he was inducted into the USA Water Polo Hall of Fame. In 2008 he was inducted into the Southern California Jewish Sports Hall of Fame, and in 2009 he was inducted into the USC Athletic Hall of Fame. In 2011 he was inducted into the Beverly Hills High Athletes Hall of Fame. In 2014 he was inducted into the International Jewish Sports Hall of Fame.

See also
 List of Olympic medalists in swimming (men)
 List of University of Southern California people
 World record progression 4 × 200 metres freestyle relay
 List of select Jewish swimmers

References

External links
 

1930 births
1997 deaths
American male freestyle swimmers
American male water polo players
World record setters in swimming
Olympic gold medalists for the United States in swimming
Olympic water polo players of the United States
Sportspeople from Los Angeles
Swimmers at the 1948 Summer Olympics
Swimmers at the 1952 Summer Olympics
USC Trojans men's swimmers
Water polo players at the 1956 Summer Olympics
Water polo players at the 1960 Summer Olympics
Medalists at the 1948 Summer Olympics
International Jewish Sports Hall of Fame inductees
Jewish American sportspeople
Jewish swimmers
Swimmers from Los Angeles
California lawyers
20th-century American lawyers
20th-century American Jews